Severe Tropical Storm Maliksi, known in the Philippines as Severe Tropical Storm Domeng, was a tropical cyclone in June 2018 that brought rainfall to the Philippines and Japan. It caused 2 deaths and prompted the PAGASA to declare the beginning of the rainy season in the Philippines. The fifth named storm and 4th tropical cyclone in the Philippine Area of Responsibility (PAR), it was first noted as an area of convection on May 31.

Meteorological history

The system was disorganized, with convection being located to the east of a broad and elongated low-level circulation. The system's low-level circulation began consolidating, and on June 2 at 00:30 UTC, the JTWC upgraded its development potential in the next day to medium. On June 3 at 18:00 UTC, the Japan Meteorological Agency (JMA) assessed that a tropical depression had formed over the Philippine Sea.

The depression began to exhibit signs of anticyclonic outflow as it was steered northward by a mid-level subtropical high-pressure area, and on June 7 at 12:00 UTC, the JTWC upgraded the system to a tropical depression, assigning it the designation 06W. 6 hours later at 18:00 UTC, both the JMA and the JTWC upgraded the depression to a tropical storm, with the JMA giving it the name Maliksi; the system's circulation remained broad. Maliksi passed by the western edge of the high-pressure area and turned northeast, and on June 9 at 06:00 UTC, the JMA upgraded it to a severe tropical storm. At 21:00 UTC, Maliksi exited the PAR, with the PAGASA issuing its final warning on the system. The JTWC assessed Maliksi to have peaked at the same time, also estimating the same windspeed in the 1-minute sustained standard. Maliksi began slowly accelerating to the northeast, developing a ragged eye as it became exposed to strong westerlies. After reaching peak intensity, convection around the center began to decrease, with the low-level circulation beginning to elongate. Maliksi began extratropical transition as it was located over an unfavorable environment, and on June 11 at 18:00 UTC, the JMA assessed that Maliksi completed its transition into an extratropical cyclone, with its low-level circulation being displaced from its upper-level circulation; the JTWC estimated extratropical transition began 6 hours earlier. Maliksi's remnants dissipated east of Honshu on June 13.

Preparations, impact, and aftermath

Philippines
The PAGASA warned residents of possible floods and landslides, advising fishermen not to go to sea. Beginning June 5, classes were suspended in parts of Luzon and the province of Biliran. 73 people were evacuated in Calabarzon.

Maliksi enhanced the southwest monsoon in the Philippines, bringing monsoonal rains over Luzon and Visayas.  A bridge received damage in San Fernando, Romblon, and on Tablas Island, power went out for a day due to fallen trees impacting power lines. Patients in the University of Santo Tomas Hospital were evacuated after floodwaters entered the building. Trees were uprooted in Quezon City and Coron, Palawan, and in Calintaan, a temporary bridge was washed out by a river. 16 houses were damaged in San Fernando, Pampanga, six of which were completely damaged. A SkyJet Airlines flight on route from Metro Manila overshot the runway at Francisco B. Reyes Airport, injuring 2 of 86 on board, including the first officer. In Batangas, 8 municipalities lost power on June 9 at 3:00 PM local time, before being restored 6 hours later. In Metro Manila, overnight rains flooded at least 43 barangays, with several streets becoming impassable. Floods in parts of Quezon City's 4th congressional district reached . On June 9 at 11:00 PM local time, due to the heavy rainfall in Metro Manila, the PAGASA issued a red rainfall advisory for the area, along with other warnings for the regions of Calabarzon and Central Luzon. Two people from Palawan and Albay drowned after jumping or falling into the ocean. 72 passengers and 2 vessels were stranded in Legazpi, Albay and Rapu-Rapu, with other ports in Oriental Mindoro suspending their operations. A total of 132 people were affected in San Fernando, Pampanga and Santa Cruz, Zambales.

Due to the effects of Maliksi, the PAGASA declared the beginning of the rainy season due to widespread rainfall in PAGASA weather stations. Those affected in San Fernando, Pampanga received ₱41 thousand (US$770) worth of aid.

Japan
As Maliksi approached Okinawa, its meteorological observatory cautioned of high waves around the island. The outer road at Kitadaitōjima was closed on June 9, with all fishing vessels being brought to port. Sea and air travel near the Daitō Islands were interrupted on June 10. On the same day, the Okinawa Meteorological Observatory issued a storm warning for the Daitō Islands, with Kitadaitōjima receiving an evacuation advisory.

In Chichibu, Saitama, there were rains around noon as the storm was approaching the Kantō Region, though winds were not strong. Some sugarcane crop in Kitadaitōjima was damaged due to strong winds.

Notes

References

External links
JMA Best Track Data 
06W.MALIKSI from the U.S. Naval Research Laboratory

Tropical cyclones in 2018
Western Pacific tropical storms
2018 Pacific typhoon season